Iredell County is a county located in the U.S. state of North Carolina. As of the 2020 census, the population was 186,693.  Its county seat is Statesville, and its largest town is Mooresville. The county was formed in 1788, subtracted from Rowan County.  It is named for James Iredell, one of the first justices of the Supreme Court of the United States. Iredell County is included in the Charlotte–Concord–Gastonia, NC–SC Metropolitan Statistical Area, as defined in 2013 by the Office of Management and Budget with data from the U.S. Census Bureau.

Historical timeline
Prior to colonization,  three Siouan-speaking tribes associated with a culture group called the Eastern Siouans probably inhabited the area that is now Iredell County. Broken into several smaller tribes, they were the Catawba, the Waccamaw Siouan, the Cheraw, the Winyaw, the Wateree and the Sugaree. The following list shows significant events and firsts in the history of the area that is now called Iredell County, North Carolina.

 1629–1712, Province of Carolina ruled by Lords Proprietors under British rule
 1712–1776, Province of North Carolina and Province of South Carolina created from Province of Carolina
 1734, Bladen County formed from New Hanover County
 1730–1750 first Scots-Irish and German immigrants seeking good soil, game, and proximity to fresh water had settled the area of modern-day Iredell County
 1750, Anson County formed from Bladen County
 1750–1776, Lord Granville and later his son issued Granville Grants of land in the Granville District, which included the area that later became Iredell County but was then Anson and later Rowan Counties
 1750, Fourth Creek Congregation established
 1753, Rowan County created from a portion of Anson County
 1754–1763, Fort Dobbs (named after Governor Arthur Dobbs) was erected as a defense facility during the French and Indian War (1754–63). Today, the location of Fort Dobbs is a North Carolina State Historic Site.
 1761, Coddle Creek Associate Reformed Presbyterian Church, Session House and Cemetery established in what became Mooresville
 1765, Centre Presbyterian Church established in what became Mooresville
 1773, William Sharpe creates map of 4th Creek Congregation
 1775, Bethany Presbyterian Church (north of Fourth Creek on Fifth Creek) and Concord Presbyterian Church (west of Fourth Creek) established as offshoots of the Fourth Creek Congregation
 1775, Aug 1, Rowan County Regiment, North Carolina Militia established; most Iredell residents that saw service while in North Carolina, served in this Regiment; for a time in 1775 and 1782 the Regiment was divided into 1st and 2nd Rowan County Regiment
 1775–1783, North Carolina contributes 30,000 to 36,000 men during the American Revolutionary War, including the Continental Army, local North Carolina County Regiments of militia, and other State Troops
 1776, Jul 4 United States Declaration of Independence signing 
 1777, State of North Carolina began issuing State Land Grants from land that came from Lord Granville estate in the Granville District
 1778, Aug, Adlai Osborne compiles Tax List of Rowan County to raise money for the upcoming Revolutionary War, including Capt Caldwell's, Capt Nichols', Capt Falls', and Capt Purviance's Districts that would become part of Iredell County in 1788
 1780, Jun 20, Battle of Ramsour's Mill nearby in what is today Lincolnton, North Carolina, many Rowan County soldiers were killed at this battle
 1787, New Sterling ARP Church established in Buffalo Shoals area that would become New Sterling
 1788, Nov 3, Iredell County was incorporated in 1788 when it was formed from adjacent Rowan County. It is named for Honorable James Iredell, Sr. (1751–1799), Attorney General of North Carolina during the Revolutionary War, Supreme Court Justice, and a delegate to the Constitutional Convention of 1788. Its county seat is Statesville.
 1789, November 21, North Carolina admitted to the Union as the 12th state
 1789, Fourth Creek Congregation location chosen by the legislature as county seat of Iredell County, named Statesville
 1790s, McKendree United Methodist Church established in Mooresville
 1790, Aug 13, first 26 lots sold in Statesville
 1794, Grassy Knob Baptist Church established near what would become Union Grove in northern Iredell County
 1800, U.S. Census shows 11 heads of household, including 68 free white persons and 27 slaves in "States Ville"
 1801, first post office established in Statesville
 1805, Mount Mourne post office established
 1819, 2nd County Courthouse built in Statesville
 1847, The only major cession of Iredell territory to another county was that to Alexander County, created in early 1847 from Iredell, Burke, and Wilkes counties.
 1854, fire burns 2nd County Courthouse and court house records
 1858, The arrival of the Western North Carolina Railroad in 1858, soon followed by the Atlantic, Tennessee and Ohio Railroad
 1861–1865, American Civil War
 1866,  Freedom United Presbyterian Church and Logan Presbyterian Church, first free black churches, established in Statesville
 1868, May 1, Tom Dooley hung in Statesville
 1891, Aug 27, The railway accident on the Bostian Bridge killed 23 people on August 27, 1891, west of Statesville, North Carolina, when a Richmond & Danville Railroad train derailed.
 1891 third U.S. Post Office and County Courthouse built in Statesville
 1899, fourth Iredell County Courthouse built in Statesville
 1900s, Industries producing tobacco, liquor, and herbs (Statesville's Wallace Herbarium was one of the largest such facilities in the world during the late 19th and early 20th centuries) were later supplemented by the production of livestock, dairy products, and breeder chickens, of which the county remains a leading producer.
 1924, Ole Time Fiddlers' Convention in Union Grove started by H.P. VanHoy to benefit local school
 1954, cowboy town of Love Valley created by Jeter Andrew Barker
 1974, about, National Balloon Rally/Fest in Troutman
 The North Carolina Auto Racing Hall of Fame in Mooresville (known as "Race City USA")

Geography

Iredell County is located within the Piedmont Region of central North Carolina. The northwestern section of the county contains the Brushy Mountains, a deeply eroded spur of the Blue Ridge Mountains far to the west. The highest point in Iredell County, Fox Mountain, is in the Brushies; it rises to 1,760 feet. Although the "Brushies", as they are often called locally, are not high in the normal sense, they do rise prominently above the surrounding countryside. The remainder of Iredell County consists of gently rolling countryside occasionally broken by low hills and small river valleys. The county's largest river, the Catawba, forms much of its western border. Lake Norman, North Carolina's largest manmade lake, is the most prominent geographic feature of southern Iredell County; it is often called North Carolina's "inland sea".

Iredell County is an important transportation center for the state, as Interstate 77 and Interstate 40 cross in northeast Statesville. This has given birth to the county's slogan "Crossroads for the Future." Residents have easy access going south on I-77 to Charlotte; north on I-77 to Elkin, North Carolina and Roanoke, Virginia; east on I-40 to Winston-Salem, Greensboro and Raleigh; and west along I-40 to Hickory, North Carolina and Asheville.

The northern third of Iredell county is highly rural and contains no large towns. Due to the thinly populated nature of this portion of the state, it is one of the select places in North Carolina where the speed limit on Interstate Highways exceeds 65 mph, as Interstate 77 north of Statesville has a speed limit of 70 mph.

Iredell County is one of the longest counties in the state and stretches for nearly fifty miles north to south from Yadkin County in the north to Mecklenburg in the south.

State and local protected areas/sites 
 Fort Dobbs State Historic Site
 Happy Oaks Recreation Park
 Lake Norman State Park
 Rimrock Preserve
 Stumpy Creek Park

Major water bodies 

 Back Creek
 Beaver Creek
 Beaverdam Creek
 Buffalo Shoals Creek
 Catawba River
 Dutchman Creek
 Fifth Creek
 Fourth Creek
 Hick Creek
 Kinder Creek
 Lake Norman
 Little Rocky Creek
 Lookout Shoals Lake
 Morrison Creek
 Norwood Creek
 Olin Creek
 Rocky Creek
 Rocky River
 Snow Creek
 South Yadkin River
 Third Creek

Adjacent counties

 Yadkin County – north (created from Surry County in 1850)
 Davie County – east (created from Rowan County in 1836)
 Rowan County – east (created from Anson County in 1753)
 Cabarrus County – southeast (created from Mecklenburg County in 1792)
 Mecklenburg County – south (created from Anson County in 1762)
 Lincoln County – southwest (created from Tryon County in 1779)
 Catawba County – southwest (created from Lincoln County in 1842)
 Alexander County – west (created from Caldwell, Iredell, and Wilkes Counties in 1847)
 Wilkes County – north (created from Surry County and parts of Washington District in 1777)

Major highways

Major infrastructure
 City of Statesville Regional Airport
 Davis Regional Heliport, near Statesville
 Iredell County is served by two railroads, Alexander Railroad and Norfolk Southern Railway
 Lake Norman Airpark (14A), near Mooresville

Demographics

2020 census

As of the 2020 United States census, there were 186,693 people, 68,145 households, and 49,635 families residing in the county.

2010 census
As of the census of 2010, there were 159,437 people, and 59,593 households in the county.  The population density was 277.8 people per square mile (82/km2).   there were 69,325 housing units at an average density of 90 per square mile (35/km2).  The racial makeup of the county was 83.3% White, 12.3% Black or African American, 0.5% Native American, 2.2% Asian, 0.1% Pacific Islander, 1.68% from other races, and 1.6% from two or more races. 7.0% of the population were Hispanic or Latino of any race.

According to the 2000 census data, there were 47,360 households, out of which 33.5% had children under the age of 18 living with them, 57.8% were married couples living together, 11.3% had a female householder with no husband present, and 26.8% were non-families. 22.7% of all households were made up of individuals, and 8.4% had someone living alone who was 65 years of age or older.  The average household size was 2.56 and the average family size was 3.00.

In the county, the population was spread out, with 25.5% under the age of 18, 7.5% from 18 to 24, 31.3% from 25 to 44, 23.3% from 45 to 64, and 12.4% who were 65 years of age or older.  The median age was 36 years. For every 100 females there were 96.1 males.  For every 100 females age 18 and over, there were 93.1 males.

, the median income for a household in the county was $50,058. Males had a median income of $34,590 versus $24,031 for females. The per capita income for the county was $26,348.  About 6.2% of families and 13.5% of the population were below the poverty line, including 10.1% of those under age 18 and 9.8% of those age 65 or over.

Government and politics
Iredell County is governed by the Board of Commissioners, consisting of five commissioners elected at-large, which requires each to attract a majority of the votes.

The Iredell County Commissioners (2016–present) are James Mallory (Chairman), Marvin Norman, Tommy Bowles, Jeff McNeely and Gene Houpe, all Republicans.

Iredell County is a member of the Centralina Council of Governments.

The Register of Deeds of Iredell County is Ronald "Duck" Wyatt (Republican), appointed in 2016.  The Register of Deeds serves as custodian and manager of a large number of land records and vital records.

Iredell County is part of prosecutorial District 22A with Alexander County. The Iredell County Courthouse is located in the county seat of Statesville, North Carolina. The District Attorney is Sarah Kirkman.

The Senior Resident Superior Court Judge is Joe Crosswhite. The Chief District Court Judge is Dale Graham. James Lee (Jim) Mixson III has served as Iredell County's Clerk of Superior Court since 2012. Clerks of Superior Court in North Carolina also serve as Probate Judges in addition to their administrative duties.

Since 1952, Iredell county voting records show a strong Republican majority. Before 1952, however, Iredell was part of the Democratic "Solid South" and voted for no Republican presidential candidate after Reconstruction except Herbert Hoover in 1928. In 1964, the year that national civil rights legislation was passed, it was one of 13 North Carolina counties to vote for Barry Goldwater. In the past 17 elections, the only Democrat to carry Iredell County was Jimmy Carter in 1976, who was a native son of Georgia and the South.

Law enforcement 

The Iredell County Sheriff's Office was founded in 1789, in the year after the county was formed from Rowan County. The Sheriff of Iredell County is Darren E. Campbell (Republican), elected in December 2014. He succeeded Phillip Redmond, who was first elected in 1994. One of the most famous prisoners held by Sheriff William Franklin Wasson in the Iredell County jail was Tom Dula, who was hung on May 1, 1868 in Statesville.

Economy
Farming is still a major source of income for many Iredell County residents. Dairy farming has been particularly popular in Iredell County since the early 1800s, in both the northern and southern sections of the county. However, the rapid population growth and development in southern Iredell County is putting increasing pressure on farmlands, and many farms in this section are giving way to shopping centers, housing developments, and large corporate office parks.

Iredell County is a major hub of NASCAR racing, with many race shops located in the county (mostly around Mooresville). Universal Technical Institute operates NASCAR Technical Institute under licensing agreements. The school offers racing-related instruction to prepare the student for their job search in the racing industry. Many NASCAR drivers live around Mooresville and Lake Norman. Although northern Iredell County has retained much of its rural character, the southern half of the county is experiencing rapid suburbanization and population growth, largely due to the immense popularity of the Lake Norman area for residents of nearby Charlotte, North Carolina's largest city.

Lowe's has its corporate headquarters in Mooresville.

Education
The county is served by two traditional public school districts: Iredell-Statesville Schools (ISS) and Mooresville Graded School District (MGSD). The county is also served by several public charter schools

Iredell Statesville School District
The following schools were in the Iredell—Statesville School District as of 2018:
 High Schools: Collaborative College for Technology and Leadership at Mitchell Community College, Career Academy and Technical School, Lake Norman High School, Monticello (combined elementary, middle, and high school, 4–12), North Iredell High School, Pressly (combined elementary, middle, and high school, K–12), South Iredell High School, Statesville Senior High School, Visual and Performing Arts Center at Statesville High at Statesville High School, West Iredell High School, Mount Mourne IB (combined middle and high schools, 6–8, 9–12 is at South Iredell High School), Northview IB (combined middle and high schools, 6–8, 9–12 is at South Iredell High School)
 Middle Schools: Woodland Heights, East Iredell, Lakeshore, North Iredell, Statesville, Troutman, West Iredell
 Elementary Schools: Celeste Henkel, Central, Cloverleaf, Coddle Creek, Cool Spring, East Iredell, Harmony, Lake Norman, Lakeshore, N. B. Mills, Scotts, Sharon, Shepherd, Third Creek, Troutman, Union Grove, Woodland Heights

Mooresville Graded School District
The following schools were in the Mooresville Graded School District, as of 2018:
 High Schools: Mooresville Senior High, N.F. Woods Advanced Technology and Arts Center
 Middle Schools: Mooresville Intermediate, East Mooresville Intermediate, Mooresville Middle
 Elementary Schools: Park View Elementary, South Elementary, Rocky River Elementary

Public charter schools
The following public charter schools existed in 2018:
 Pine Lake Preparatory
 Langtree Charter Academy
 American Renaissance School
 Iredell Charter Academy

Private schools
 Statesville Christian School
 Woodlawn School

Higher education
The following current and historical institutions of higher education were located in Iredell County:
 Clio's Nursery of Arts and Sciences (1778)
 Concord Female Seminary, Female Seminary in Statesville (1832)
 Crowfield Academy (operated from 1760–1788)
 Ebenezer Academy (1821)
 Mitchell College, Statesville: Mitchell Community College was originally founded in 1856 in Statesville, North Carolina, as Concord Female College. The school was purchased by Robert and Roxanna Simonton around 1872 and renamed Simonton Female College. It became Mitchell College in 1917.
 Olin High School (1857)
 Snow Creek Academy (1849)
 Statesville/Clio Academy, Muschat's Academy (1814)

Communities

City
 Statesville (county seat, established in 1789)

Towns
 Davidson (established in 1837, mostly in Mecklenburg County)
 Harmony (Post Office established in 1883)
 Love Valley (established in 1954)
 Mooresville (largest town, Post Office established in 1871)
 Troutman (Post Office established in 1872)

Census-designated places
 Lake Norman of Iredell
 Stony Point (town in both Alexander and Iredell Counties, Post Office established in 1826)

Unincorporated communities
As of 2019, the unincorporated communities in the county include:

 Amity Hill (Post Office established in 1851)
 Barium Springs (Post Office established in 1889)
 Houstonville (Post Office established in 1813)
 Mount Mourne (Post Office established in 1805)
 Olin (Post Office established in 1856)
 Scotts (Post Office established in 1894, called Scott's Crossroads in 1873)
 Turnersburg (Post Office established in 1858, originally called Turnersburgh)
 Union Grove (established in 1867)

Townships
By the requirements of the North Carolina Constitution of 1868, all counties in North Carolina were divided into townships. Previous to that time, the subdivisions in Iredell County were Captain's Districts. While the Captain's Districts referred primarily to the militia, it served also for the election precinct, the tax listing and tax collecting district.   The following townships were created in 1868:

 Barringer
 Bethany
 Chambersburg
 Coddle Creek
 Concord
 Cool Springs
 Davidson
 Eagle Mills
 Fallstown
 New Hope
 Olin
 Sharpesburg
 Shiloh
 Statesville
 Turnersburg
 Union Grove

Historical populated places
In the 1700s and 1800s, before there were many towns in what became Iredell County, property was identified by stream, rivers, or adjacent landowners.  The following is a list of the streams, rivers, and creeks in Iredell County.

 Back Creek (R)
 Bear Branch
 Beaver Dam Creek (R)
 Brotherton Branch
 Brushy Creek
 Buffalo Branch
 Buffalo Shoals Creek/aka 8 Miles Shoals Creek
 Catawba River
 Cavin Creek
 Coddle Creek (R)
 Davidson's Creek (M)
 Drop Off Creek
 Duck Creek
 Dutchman's Creek
 Elk Shoal's Creek
 Eupetic Springs
 Fifth Creek (R)
 Five Mile Branch
 Fourth Creek (R)
 Glade Creek
 Gregory Branch
 Hunting Creek
 Island Creek
 Kerr Branch
 Knowden's Ford
 Little Dutchman's Creek
 Little River
 Little Rocky Branch
 Long Branch
 North Fork of the Yadkin River
 Norwood(s) Creek[2]
 Oil Mill Branch
 Old Camp Creek
 Old House Creek
 Olin Creek, aka Middle Fork of Rocky Creek
 Porter's Branch
 Rock Cut, Deep Cut
 Rocky Creek
 Rocky River (M)
 South Branch
 South Fork of Grassy Creek, aka Yadkin River
 South Yadkin River (A)
 Speaks Creek
 Third Creek (R)
 Turkey Foot Branch
 West Rocky River (M)
 Withrow's Creek (R)
 Yadkin River (R) (D)
 Young's Creek

(R)--Portions in Rowan County
(D)--Portions in Davie County
(M)--Portions in Mecklenburg County
(A)--Portions in Alexander County

The table below lists towns and post offices (PO) that no longer exist or that were once in Iredell County but are now in another county:

Notable people
 Jeter Andrew Barker, Jr. (1924–2011), military veteran, contractor, philanthropist, and founder of the old-west town Love Valley
 Hutchins Gordon Burton (aft. 1774–1836), 22nd Governor of North Carolina, died while visiting relatives in Iredell County
 Thomas C. "Tom" Dula aka Dooley (1848–1868), tried, convicted, and hanged for murder in Statesville, North Carolina
 Bobby Dale Earnhardt (b. 1987), NASCAR racing driver
 Rev. James Hall, D.D. (1744–1826), Presbyterian minister
 Edward Harris (1763–1813), lawyer, politician and judge
 Daisy Hendley Gold (1893–1975), author and journalist
 James Iredell, Sr. (1750–1799), County namesake
 Mildred Maxine (Jenkins) Miller (1932–2011), local historian, author, and President of the Genealogical Society of Iredell County
 Homer Maxwell Keever (1905–1979), local teacher, historian and author
 Rev. Mussenden Ebenezer Matthews (abt. 1751–1830), revolutionary Lieutenant, Presbyterian minister, and politician
 Anderson Mitchell (1800–1876), US Congressman from North Carolina
 Col Adlai Osborne (1744–1814), lawyer, public official, plantation owner, educational leader, Revolutionary War officer of the 2nd Rowan County Regiment
 Rufus Reid (planter) (1797–1854), planter and builder of Mount Mourne plantation, politician
 William Sharpe (1742–1818), Revolutionary War patriot, lawyer, politician, author of the Fourth Creek Congregation map in 1773
 Adam Torrence, Sr. (1732–1780), Revolutionary War patriot killed at the Battle of Ramsour's Mill, owner of Torrence Tavern where the Battle of Torrence's Tavern took place
 Wilfred D. Turner (1855–1933),  ninth Lieutenant Governor of North Carolina
 Zebulon Baird Vance (1830–1894), Governor of North Carolina, lived and owned a home in Statesville (currently, a museum run by the DAR)

See also
 List of counties in North Carolina
 National Register of Historic Places listings in Iredell County, North Carolina
 People from Iredell County, North Carolina
 Statesville Record & Landmark (local newspaper)
 USS Iredell County (LST-839)
 Fort Dobbs (North Carolina) (located just north of Statesville)
 Iredell County Sheriff's Office
 North Carolina State Parks

References

Bibliography
 Keever, Homer M.; Iredell Piedmont County, with illustrations by Louise Gilbert and maps by Mild red Jenkins Miller, published for the Iredell County Bicentennial Commission by Brady Printing Company from type set by the Statesville Record and Landmark, copyright, November 1976, by Homer M. Keever.
 The Heritage of Iredell County, 1980, published by the Genealogical Society of Iredell County, PO Box 946, Statesville, North Carolina 28677, 642 pages with index
 The Heritage of Iredell County, NC Vol II, 2000, published by the Genealogical Society of Iredell County, PO Box 946, Statesville, North Carolina 29866, LC # 00-110956, 574 pages with index

External links

 
 

 
1788 establishments in North Carolina
Populated places established in 1788
Charlotte metropolitan area